This list of tallest buildings in Peru ranks Peruvian skyscrapers that stand at least 95 metres (311 ft), based on standard height measurement. This includes architectural details but does not include antenna masts.

Tallest buildings

See also
List of tallest buildings in South America

Notes

References

Tallest
Peru

Peru
Buildings